Discomyza incurva is a species of fly in the family Ephydridae. It is found in the  Palearctic.
It is 2.5–3 mm.long. Found July-September. The habitat is grasslands. All Europe especially South Europe. Also North Africa. D. incurva is a parasite of Helix spp. land snails.

Distribution
Canada, Senegal, Albania, Algeria, Austria, Bulgaria, Cyprus, Czech Republic, Great Britain, Switzerland, Germany.

References

External links
Images representing Discomyza incurva at BOLD

Ephydridae
Insects described in 1823
Diptera of Europe
Diptera of Africa
Diptera of North America
Taxa named by Carl Fredrik Fallén